Jesús Everardo Rubio Quintero (born 24 December 1996) is a Mexican professional footballer who plays for Liga MX club Tijuana, on loan from Santos de Guápiles. A physically strong, aggressive, and versatile defender, although he is usually deployed as a centre-back, he is also capable of playing as a left-back, both in a three or four-man defence.

At club level, Rubio began his professional career with Murciélagos in 2015 in the Ascenso MX, also later playing for Murcielagos in Liga Premier before moving to Tacoma Defiance in 2019.

Club career

Deportivo Guamuchil
Rubio joined the youth teams of Deportivo Guamuchil F.C. as a child before earning first team call-ups for the 2011–12 Tercera División de México season at just 16 year old.

Murcielagos
Rubio was eventually promoted with Murcielagos in 2014 playing in Liga Premier. With the team moving up to Ascenso MX in 2015, he began playing regularly at only 18 years old, mostly as defensive minded left-back.

Tacoma Defiance
After playing the 2018–19 season as captain of Murcielagos, with 28 appearances and 5 goals, Rubio was signed by Tacoma Defiance in the summer 2019 for the remaining part of the 2019 USL Championship season.

Colorado Springs Switchbacks FC
Rubio joined USL Championship side Colorado Springs Switchbacks FC in January 2020. While the start of the 2020 season was delayed by months due to the Covid pandemic, Rubio quickly established himself as a starter and finished the season as leader in anticipations and clearances per match.

Chalatenango
With the uncertainty around a delayed start in the USL 2021 season, Rubio opted to move to Chalatenango, signing initially until the end of the 2020–21 season. After just one tournament, Rubio signed on loan with Santos de Guápiles in June 2021.

Santos de Guápiles
At Santos, Rubio become immediately one of Costa Rica league toughest centrebacks due to his aerial power and man marking. Santos was semifinalist in his first tournament with the club and also qualified for Concacaf Champions League 2022.

Career statistics

Club

Style of play
Rubio began his professional career as a defensive-minded left-back, but later made his name as an aggressive, courageous, physical, and hard-tackling centre-back, with a penchant for scoring headers from set-pieces, due to his aerial prowess and strength. A versatile, consistent, commanding, and dependable left-footed defender, with good awareness, positional sense, and an ability to read the game, he is capable of playing both in a three or four-man defence. A hard-working player, he is also known for his ability to cover ground and put pressure on or anticipate opponents in positions higher up on the pitch. Due to his tenacious, no-nonsense playing style, Rubio can be described as an "old-fashioned" centre-back, who primarily serves as a ball-winner; his physicality and aggression as a defender, have earned him the nickname "Mexican Chiellini", in honor of Italian left footer centre-back Giorgio Chiellini. A mobile defender, he possesses good vision and reliable distribution, which allows him to play the ball out or launch attacks from the back after winning back possession. Moreover, he possesses a strong mentality, good temperament under pressure, determination, and excellent concentration.

Personal life
Rubio was born and raised in the small town of Mocorito in the state of Sinaloa. He is married with one child. Rubio is also an avid guitar player and songwriter of Regional Mexican corrido (narrative ballad) music in his spare time.

References

External links
Seattle Sounders FC player profile

1996 births
Living people
Sportspeople from Culiacán
Footballers from Sinaloa
Mexican footballers
Association football defenders
Tacoma Defiance players
USL Championship players
Murciélagos FC footballers
Colorado Springs Switchbacks FC players
Mexican expatriate footballers
Mexican expatriate sportspeople in the United States
Expatriate soccer players in the United States